Maltepe Mosque is a mosque in Ankara, Turkey. Along with Kocatepe Mosque, it is one of the best known mosques in Ankara.

Location

History

The mosque was commissioned by a NGO established to build the mosque. It was planned by Recai Akçay. The area was consecrated by the municipality of Ankara. The ground breaking ceremony was in 1954 and it was completed in 1959

The building
It is a square-plan building each side being . It is a floor heated mosque. The lower  of the side walls is coated by ceramic.

References

Mosques in Ankara
Çankaya, Ankara
Mosques completed in 1959
Mosque buildings with domes
20th-century religious buildings and structures in Turkey